David Aubrey Llewellyn Bowen  (31 January 1924 – 31 March 2011) was a Welsh pathologist. He studied medicine at Corpus Christi College, Cambridge. He was involved in the Dennis Nilsen case, and also that of John Duffy and David Mulcahy, the murder of PC Keith Blakelock and the death of the financier Roberto Calvi.

In popular culture 
Bowen was portrayed by Jonathan Coy in Des, a 2020 docudrama focusing on Dennis Nilsen.

References 

1924 births
2011 deaths
Alumni of Corpus Christi College, Cambridge
Welsh pathologists
Fellows of the Royal College of Pathologists
Fellows of the Royal College of Physicians
Fellows of the Royal College of Physicians of Edinburgh
Forensic pathologists
British forensic scientists